
Gmina Bierutów is an urban-rural gmina (administrative district) in Oleśnica County, Lower Silesian Voivodeship, in south-western Poland. It is part of the Wrocław metropolitan area.

Neighbouring gminas
Gmina Bierutów is bordered by the gminas of Czernica, Dziadowa Kłoda, Jelcz-Laskowice, Namysłów, Oleśnica and Wilków.

Villages
Apart from the town of Bierutów, the gmina contains the villages of Gorzesław, Jemielna, Karwiniec, Kijowice, Kruszowice, Paczków, Posadowice, Radzieszyn, Sątok, Solniki Małe, Solniki Wielkie, Stronia, Strzałkowa, Wabienice, Zawidowice and Zbytowa.

Twin towns – sister cities

Gmina Bierutów is twinned with:
 Bernstadt auf dem Eigen, Germany

References

Bierutow
Oleśnica County